The 2004–05 Liga Gimel season saw 99 clubs competing in 8 regional divisions for promotion to Liga Bet.

Upper Galilee Division
Promoted to Liga Bet:
Maccabi Kafr Yasif (division champions)
Hapoel Kisra
Maccabi Kafr Sumei

Other league clubs:
Alpha Ironi Safed
Beitar Abu Snan
Beitar Bi'ina
Beitar Karmiel
Bnei Kisra
F.C. Hurfeish
Hapoel Bnei Gush Halav
Hapoel Deir al-Asad
Hapoel Ironi Hatzor
Hapoel Rehaniya
Maccabi Beit Jann
Maccabi Bi'ina

Western Galilee Division
Promoted to Liga Bet:
Beitar Ihud Mashhad (division champions)
Hapoel Halat el-Sharif Tamra
Ahva Arraba

Other league clubs:
Ahi Acre
Beitar el-Amal Nazareth
Beitar al-Ittihad Shefa-'Amr
Hapoel Daburiyya
Hapoel Kaukab
Hapoel Shefa-'Amr
Maccabi Ironi Kabul
Maccabi al-Heib
Maccabi Sha'ab

Jezreel Division
Promoted to Liga Bet:
Hapoel Isfiya (division champions)

Other league clubs:
Beitar Iksal
Beitar F.C. Tabbash
Beitar Afula
F.C. Emek Yizra'el
Hapoel al-Ittihad Nazareth
Hapoel Bnei Kababir
Hapoel Kfar Kama
Hapoel Kvalim Mesilot
Hapoel Ramot Menashe Megiddo
Hapoel Spartak Haifa
Maccabi Neve Sha'anan

Samaria Division
Promoted to Liga Bet:
Maccabi Umm al-Fahm (division champions)

Other league clubs:
Al-Ahli Baqa
Beitar Umm al-Fahm
Bnei Baqa al-Gharbiyye
F.C. Afek
Hapoel Bnei Zemer
Hapoel Basmat Tab'un
Hapoel Kafr Sulam
Hapoel Muawiya
Hapoel Umm al-Ghanam Nein
Maccabi Fureidis
Maccabi HaSharon Netanya
Maccabi Ironi Jatt

Sharon Division
Promoted to Liga Bet:
Maccabi Amishav Petah Tikva (division champions)
Hapoel Ihud Bnei Jaffa

Other league clubs:
Beitar Ironi Ariel
Beitar Oranit
Beitar Pardes Hanna
Beitar Tubruk
Hapoel Aliyah Kfar Saba
Hapoel Beit Eliezer
Hapoel Bik'at HaYarden
Hapoel Kafr Bara
Hapoel Pardesiya

Tel Aviv Division
Promoted to Liga Bet:
A.S. Holon (division champions)

Other league clubs:
Beitar Ezra
Beitar Pardes Katz
Brit Sport Ma'of
Elitzur Yehud
Elitzur Jaffa Tel Aviv
Hapoel F.C. Ortodoxim Jaffa
Hapoel Kiryat Shalom
Hapoel Neve Golan
Maccabi Dynamo Holon
Maccabi Ironi Or Yehuda
Shikun Vatikim Ramat Gan

Central Division
Promoted to Liga Bet:
Hapoel Maxim Lod (division champions)

Other league clubs:
Hapoel Azrikam
Hapoel Be'er Ya'akov
Hapoel F.C. Ortodoxim Lod
Hapoel Monosson Yehud
Hapoel Ramla
F.C. Shikun HaMizrah
Ironi Beit Dagan
Ironi Lod
Maccabi Rehovot

South Division
Promoted to Liga Bet:
Hapoel Masos Segev Shalom (division champions)
Hapoel Tel Sheva
F.C. Dimona

Other league clubs:
Beitar Ironi Ma'ale Adumim
F.C. Arad
Hapoel Bnei Shimon
Hapoel Hura
Hapoel Rahat
Hapoel Sde Uziyah/Be'er Tuvia
Ironi Beit Shemesh
Maccabi Bnei Abu Gosh
Maccabi Lod

External links
Liga Gimel Upper Galilee The Israel Football Association 
Liga Gimel Western Galilee The Israel Football Association 
Liga Gimel Jezreel The Israel Football Association 
Liga Gimel Samaria The Israel Football Association 
Liga Gimel Sharon The Israel Football Association 
Liga Gimel Tel Aviv The Israel Football Association 
Liga Gimel Central The Israel Football Association 
Liga Gimel South The Israel Football Association 

6
Liga Gimel seasons